The 2020 Piala Belia was the 10th season of the Piala Belia since its establishment in 2008. The league is currently the youth level (U19) football league in Malaysia. Terengganu are the defending champions. 19 teams competed in this season. All teams were drawn into two different groups, and plays in a maximum of 18 home-and-away matches. Top eight teams after the completion of group stage matches progressed to knockout stage.

Teams 
The following teams are participating in the 2020 Piala Belia.

Group A (Northern Zone)
 AMD U16
 Felda United U19
 Kedah U19
 Kelantan U19
 Pahang U19
 PDRM U19
 Perak IV
 Pulau Pinang U19
 Terengganu IV

Group B (Southern Zone)
 Johor Darul Ta'zim IV
 Kuala Lumpur U19
 Melaka U19
 Negeri Sembilan U19
 PJ City U19
 Sabah U19
 Sarawak United U19
 Selangor U19
 UiTM U19
 UKM U19

League table

Group A

Group B

Result table

Group A

Group B

See also 

 2020 Piala Presiden

References

External links 

 Football Association of Malaysia
 SPMB 

Football leagues in Malaysia
Football in Malaysia
Piala Belia